USS Montauk may refer to the following ships of the United States Navy:

 , was a monitor, commissioned in 1862 and decommissioned in 1865
 , was a minesweeper, purchased in 1917 and wrecked in 1918
 , was a tug, commissioned in 1917 and sold in 1920
 , was a transport commissioned in 1944 then renamed Galilea (AKN-6) in 1946 and decommissioned in 1947

United States Navy ship names